In statistics, the coefficient of determination, denoted R2 or r2 and pronounced "R squared", is the proportion of the variation in the dependent variable that is predictable from the independent variable(s).

It is a statistic used in the context of statistical models whose main purpose is either the prediction of future outcomes or the testing of hypotheses, on the basis of other related information. It provides a measure of how well observed outcomes are replicated by the model, based on the proportion of total variation of outcomes explained by the model.

There are several definitions of R2 that are only sometimes equivalent. One class of such cases includes that of simple linear regression where r2 is used instead of R2. When only an intercept is included, then r2 is simply the square of the sample correlation coefficient (i.e., r) between the observed outcomes and the observed predictor values. If additional regressors are included, R2 is the square of the coefficient of multiple correlation. In both such cases, the coefficient of determination normally ranges from 0 to 1.

There are cases where R2 can yield negative values. This can arise when the predictions that are being compared to the corresponding outcomes have not been derived from a model-fitting procedure using those data. Even if a model-fitting procedure has been used, R2 may still be negative, for example when linear regression is conducted without including an intercept, or when a non-linear function is used to fit the data. In cases where negative values arise, the mean of the data provides a better fit to the outcomes than do the fitted function values, according to this particular criterion.

The coefficient of determination can be more (intuitively) informative than MAE, MAPE, MSE, and RMSE in regression analysis evaluation, as the former can be expressed as a percentage, whereas the latter measures have arbitrary ranges. It also proved more robust for poor fits compared to SMAPE on the test datasets in the article.

When evaluating the goodness-of-fit of simulated (Ypred) vs. measured (Yobs) values, it is not appropriate to base this on the R2 of the linear regression (i.e., Yobs= m·Ypred + b). The R2 quantifies the degree of any linear correlation between Yobs and Ypred, while for the goodness-of-fit evaluation only one specific linear correlation should be taken into consideration: Yobs = 1·Ypred + 0 (i.e., the 1:1 line).

Definitions

A data set has n values marked y1,...,yn (collectively known as yi or as a vector y = [y1,...,yn]T), each associated with a fitted (or modeled, or predicted) value f1,...,fn (known as fi, or sometimes ŷi, as a vector f).

Define the residuals as ei = yi − fi (forming a vector e).

If  is the mean of the observed data:

then the variability of the data set can be measured with two sums of squares formulas:
 The sum of squares of residuals, also called the residual sum of squares: 
 The total sum of squares (proportional to the variance of the data): 

The most general definition of the coefficient of determination is

A baseline model, which always predicts , will have . Models that have worse predictions than this baseline will have a negative .

Relation to unexplained variance

In a general form, R2 can be seen to be related to the fraction of variance unexplained (FVU), since the second term compares the unexplained variance (variance of the model's errors) with the total variance (of the data):

As explained variance
Suppose R2 = 0.49. This implies that 49% of the variability of the dependent variable in the data set has been accounted for, and the remaining 51% of the variability is still unaccounted for. 
For regression models, the regression sum of squares, also called the explained sum of squares, is defined as

In some cases, as in simple linear regression, the total sum of squares equals the sum of the two other sums of squares defined above:

See Partitioning in the general OLS model for a derivation of this result for one case where the relation holds. When this relation does hold, the above definition of R2 is equivalent to

where n is the number of observations (cases) on the variables.

In this form R2 is expressed as the ratio of the explained variance (variance of the model's predictions, which is SSreg / n) to the total variance (sample variance of the dependent variable, which is SStot / n).

This partition of the sum of squares holds for instance when the model values ƒi have been obtained by linear regression. A milder sufficient condition reads as follows: The model has the form

This set of conditions is an important one and it has a number of implications for the properties of the fitted residuals and the modelled values. In particular, under these conditions:

As squared correlation coefficient
In linear least squares multiple regression with an estimated intercept term, R2 equals the square of the Pearson correlation coefficient between the observed  and modeled (predicted)  data values of the dependent variable.

In a linear least squares regression with an intercept term and a single explanator, this is also equal to the squared Pearson correlation coefficient of the dependent variable  and explanatory variable 

It should not be confused with the correlation coefficient between two explanatory variables, defined as
	

	
where the covariance between two coefficient estimates, as well as their standard deviations, are obtained from the covariance matrix of the coefficient estimates, .

Under more general modeling conditions, where the predicted values might be generated from a model different from linear least squares regression, an R2 value can be calculated as the square of the correlation coefficient between the original  and modeled  data values. In this case, the value is not directly a measure of how good the modeled values are, but rather a measure of how good a predictor might be constructed from the modeled values (by creating a revised predictor of the form α + βƒi). According to Everitt, this usage is specifically the definition of the term "coefficient of determination": the square of the correlation between two (general) variables.

Interpretation
R2 is a measure of the goodness of fit of a model. In regression, the R2 coefficient of determination is a statistical measure of how well the regression predictions approximate the real data points. An R2 of 1 indicates that the regression predictions perfectly fit the data.

Values of R2 outside the range 0 to 1 occur when the model fits the data worse than the worst possible least-squares predictor (equivalent to a horizontal hyperplane at a height equal to the mean of the observed data). This occurs when a wrong model was chosen, or nonsensical constraints were applied by mistake. If equation 1 of Kvålseth is used (this is the equation used most often), R2 can be less than zero. If equation 2 of Kvålseth is used, R2 can be greater than one.

In all instances where R2 is used, the predictors are calculated by ordinary least-squares regression: that is, by minimizing SSres. In this case, R2 increases as the number of variables in the model is increased (R2 is monotone increasing with the number of variables included—it will never decrease). This illustrates a drawback to one possible use of R2, where one might keep adding variables (kitchen sink regression) to increase the R2 value. For example, if one is trying to predict the sales of a model of car from the car's gas mileage, price, and engine power, one can include such irrelevant factors as the first letter of the model's name or the height of the lead engineer designing the car because the R2 will never decrease as variables are added and will likely experience an increase due to chance alone.

This leads to the alternative approach of looking at the adjusted R2. The explanation of this statistic is almost the same as R2 but it penalizes the statistic as extra variables are included in the model. For cases other than fitting by ordinary least squares, the R2 statistic can be calculated as above and may still be a useful measure. If fitting is by weighted least squares or generalized least squares, alternative versions of R2 can be calculated appropriate to those statistical frameworks, while the "raw" R2 may still be useful if it is more easily interpreted. Values for R2 can be calculated for any type of predictive model, which need not have a statistical basis.

In a multiple linear model
Consider a linear model with more than a single explanatory variable, of the form

The quantities  are unknown coefficients, whose values are estimated by least squares. The coefficient of determination R2 is a measure of the global fit of the model. Specifically, R2 is an element of [0, 1] and represents the proportion of variability in Yi that may be attributed to some linear combination of the regressors (explanatory variables) in X.

R2 is often interpreted as the proportion of response variation "explained" by the regressors in the model. An interior value such as R2 = 0.7 may be interpreted as follows: "Seventy percent of the variance in the response variable can be explained by the explanatory variables. The remaining thirty percent can be attributed to unknown, lurking variables or inherent variability."

A caution that applies to R2, as to other statistical descriptions of correlation and association is that "correlation does not imply causation." In other words, while correlations may sometimes provide valuable clues in uncovering causal relationships among variables, a non-zero estimated correlation between two variables is not, on its own, evidence that changing the value of one variable would result in changes in the values of other variables. For example, the practice of carrying matches (or a lighter) is correlated with incidence of lung cancer, but carrying matches does not cause cancer (in the standard sense of "cause").

In case of a single regressor, fitted by least squares, R2 is the square of the Pearson product-moment correlation coefficient relating the regressor and the response variable. More generally, R2 is the square of the correlation between the constructed predictor and the response variable. With more than one regressor, the R2 can be referred to as the coefficient of multiple determination.

Inflation of R2
In least squares regression using typical data, R2 is at least weakly increasing with increases in the number of regressors in the model. Because increases in the number of regressors increase the value of R2, R2 alone cannot be used as a meaningful comparison of models with very different numbers of independent variables. For a meaningful comparison between two models, an F-test can be performed on the residual sum of squares , similar to the F-tests in Granger causality, though this is not always appropriate. As a reminder of this, some authors denote R2 by Rq2, where q is the number of columns in X (the number of explanators including the constant).

To demonstrate this property, first recall that the objective of least squares linear regression is

where Xi is a row vector of values of explanatory variables for case i and b is a column vector of coefficients of the respective elements of Xi.

Given the previous conclusion and noting that  depends only on y, the non-decreasing property of R2 follows directly from the definition above.

The intuitive reason that using an additional explanatory variable cannot lower the R2 is this: Minimizing  is equivalent to maximizing R2. When the extra variable is included, the data always have the option of giving it an estimated coefficient of zero, leaving the predicted values and the R2 unchanged. The only way that the optimization problem will give a non-zero coefficient is if doing so improves the R2.

Caveats
R2 does not indicate whether:
 the independent variables are a cause of the changes in the dependent variable;
 omitted-variable bias exists;
 the correct regression was used;
 the most appropriate set of independent variables has been chosen;
 there is collinearity present in the data on the explanatory variables;
 the model might be improved by using transformed versions of the existing set of independent variables;
 there are enough data points to make a solid conclusion.

Extensions

Adjusted R2

There are many different ways of adjusting. By far the most used one, to the point that it is typically just referred to as adjusted R, is the correction proposed by  Mordecai Ezekiel. 
The adjusted R2 is defined as

where dfres is the degrees of freedom of the estimate of the population variance around the model, and dftot is the degrees of freedom  of the estimate of the population variance around the mean. dfres is given in terms of the sample size n and the number of variables p in the model, dfres =n − p. dftot is given in the same way, but with p being unity for the mean, i.e. dftot = n − 1.

Inserting the degrees of freedom and using the definition of R2, it can be rewritten as:

where p is the total number of explanatory variables in the model, and n is the sample size.

The adjusted R2 can be negative, and its value will always be less than or equal to that of R2. Unlike R2, the adjusted R2 increases only when the increase in R2 (due to the inclusion of a new explanatory variable) is more than one would expect to see by chance. If a set of explanatory variables with a predetermined hierarchy of importance are introduced into a regression one at a time, with the adjusted R2 computed each time, the level at which adjusted R2 reaches a maximum, and decreases afterward, would be the regression with the ideal combination of having the best fit without excess/unnecessary terms.

Adjusted R2 can be interpreted as a less biased estimator of the population R2, whereas the observed sample R2 is a positively biased estimate of the population value. Adjusted R2 is more appropriate when evaluating model fit (the variance in the dependent variable accounted for by the independent variables) and in comparing alternative models in the feature selection stage of model building.

The principle behind the adjusted R2 statistic can be seen by rewriting the ordinary R2 as

Despite using unbiased estimators for the population variances of the error and the dependent variable,  adjusted R2 is not an unbiased estimator of the population R2, which results by using the population variances of the errors and the dependent variable instead of estimating them.  Ingram Olkin and John W. Pratt derived the Minimum-variance unbiased estimator for the population R2, which is known as Olkin-Pratt estimator. Comparisons of different approaches for adjusting R2 concluded that in most situations either an approximate version of the Olkin-Pratt estimator  or the exact Olkin-Pratt estimator   should be preferred over (Ezekiel) adjusted R2.

Coefficient of partial determination

The coefficient of partial determination can be defined as the proportion of variation that cannot be explained in a reduced model, but can be explained by the predictors specified in a full(er) model. This coefficient is used to provide insight into whether or not one or more additional predictors may be useful in a more fully specified regression model.

The calculation for the partial R2 is relatively straightforward after estimating two models and generating the ANOVA tables for them. The calculation for the partial R2 is

which is analogous to the usual coefficient of determination:

Generalizing and decomposing R2 

As explained above, model selection heuristics such as the Adjusted  criterion and the F-test examine whether the total  sufficiently increases to determine if a new regressor should be added to the model. If a regressor is added to the model that is highly correlated with other regressors which have already been included, then the total  will hardly increase, even if the new regressor is of relevance. As a result, the above-mentioned heuristics will ignore relevant regressors when cross-correlations are high.

As Hoornweg (2018) shows, several shrinkage estimators – such as Bayesian linear regression, ridge regression, and the (adaptive) lasso – make use of this decomposition of  when they gradually shrink parameters from the unrestricted OLS solutions towards the hypothesized values. Let us first define the linear regression model as 
 
It is assumed that the matrix  is standardized with Z-scores and that the column vector  is centered to have a mean of zero. Let the column vector  refer to the hypothesized regression parameters and let the column vector  denote the estimated parameters. We can then define 
 
An  of 75% means that the in-sample accuracy improves by 75% if the data-optimized  solutions are used instead of the hypothesized  values. In the special case that  is a vector of zeros, we obtain the traditional  again.

This  times  matrix is given by
 
where . As a result, the diagonal elements of  may be smaller than 0 and, in more exceptional cases, larger than 1. Click on the lasso for an example.

R2 in logistic regression 
In the case of logistic regression, usually fit by maximum likelihood, there are several choices of pseudo-R2.

One is the generalized R2 originally proposed by Cox & Snell, and independently by Magee:
 
where  is the likelihood of the model with only the intercept,  is the likelihood of the estimated model (i.e., the model with a given set of parameter estimates) and n is the sample size. It is easily rewritten to:
 
where D is the test statistic of the likelihood ratio test.

Nico Nagelkerke,  noted that it had the following properties:
 It is consistent with the classical coefficient of determination when both can be computed;
 Its value is maximised by the maximum likelihood estimation of a model;
 It is asymptotically independent of the sample size;
 The interpretation is the proportion of the variation explained by the model;
 The values are between 0 and 1, with 0 denoting that model does not explain any variation and 1 denoting that it perfectly explains the observed variation;
 It does not have any unit.

However, in the case of a logistic model, where  cannot be greater than 1, R2 is between 0 and : thus, Nagelkerke suggested the possibility to define a scaled R2 as R2/R2max.

Comparison with norm of residuals
Occasionally, the norm of residuals is used for indicating goodness of fit. This term is calculated as the square-root of the sum of squares of residuals:

Both R2 and the norm of residuals have their relative merits. For least squares analysis R2 varies between 0 and 1, with larger numbers indicating better fits and 1 representing a perfect fit. The norm of residuals varies from 0 to infinity with smaller numbers indicating better fits and zero indicating a perfect fit. One advantage and disadvantage of R2 is the  term acts to normalize the value. If the yi values are all multiplied by a constant, the norm of residuals will also change by that constant but R2 will stay the same. As a basic example, for the linear least squares fit to the set of data:
R2 = 0.998, and norm of residuals = 0.302.
If all values of y are multiplied by 1000 (for example, in an SI prefix change), then R2 remains the same, but norm of residuals = 302.

Another single-parameter indicator of fit is the RMSE of the residuals, or standard deviation of the residuals. This would have a value of 0.135 for the above example given that the fit was linear with an unforced intercept.

History

The creation of the coefficient of determination has been attributed to the geneticist Sewall Wright and was first published in 1921.

See also
 Anscombe's quartet
 Fraction of variance unexplained
 Goodness of fit
 Nash–Sutcliffe model efficiency coefficient (hydrological applications)
 Pearson product-moment correlation coefficient
 Proportional reduction in loss
 Regression model validation
 Root mean square deviation
 Stepwise regression

Notes

Further reading 
 
  
 
 
 

Regression diagnostics
Statistical ratios
Least squares